Voro (Vɔrɔ,  Bena, Buna, Ebina, Ebuna, Woro, Yungur) is an Adamawa language of Nigeria.

References

Languages of Nigeria
Bambukic languages